Clarens is a small town situated in the foothills of the Maluti Mountains in the Free State province of South Africa and nicknamed the "Jewel of the Eastern Free State". It was established in 1912 and named after the town of Clarens in Switzerland where exiled Paul Kruger spent his last days. It is situated 336 km from Johannesburg, 284 km from Bloemfontein, 389 km from Durban.

History 

A farm called "Leliehoek" (English: Lily Corner) was bought from Hermanus Steyn in 1910, and in 1911 Piet de Villiers sold his farm "Naauwpoort" (situated near the Titanic rock) to a company wanting to establish a village there. These two farms were divided into erven and sold for fifty pounds each.

A commission was appointed in 1912 to finalize negotiations, and a decision was made to name the village "Clarens" in honour of President Paul Kruger’s influence in the area. This came about in the following way - during the Free State-Basotho War of 1865 - 1866, five "burgers" from the Transvaal were murdered in the Eastern Free State, and as a result war was declared against the Basotho leader, Moshoeshoe.

Paul Kruger, together with a commando of burgers, defeated the Basotho at the Battle of Naauwpoortnek (near Titanic rock). President Kruger spent his last days as a voluntary exile in the attractive village of Clarens in Switzerland, and thus Clarens was named for this Swiss town. A monument was erected on the farm "Ararat" just outside Clarens, in honour of the five burghers murdered by the Basotho on 29 September 1865, during the siege of Naauwpoort. This monument was later moved to Clarens and placed in the central town square, where it stands to this day.

Tourism
Clarens is an artists' haven with many well-known artists either living in or frequenting the village, with many art galleries scattered around the village square and the town. The tranquil village ambience combined with scenic views and a mild climate has made Clarens a popular getaway for city dwellers from Johannesburg, Bloemfontein and Durban, among other places. Clarens is known for its spectacular sandstone mountains and wonderful climate; it is one of the most picturesque spots in South Africa and has recently been acclaimed as the best Trout Fishing waters in South Africa.

The Golden Gate Highlands National Park with its sandstone formations and cliffs is 17 km from Clarens.

Close to Clarens is the outlet from the Lesotho Highlands Water Project that brings fresh water from Lesotho to feed into the As River (Afrikaans for "axle" because a wagon broke its axle when crossing, but has been mistakenly translated into English as "ash"), Liebenbergsvlei and Wilge Rivers fed into the Vaal Dam. Water from the Vaal Dam is then abstracted, treated and pumped to the Rand Water supply area.

Clarens is part of the scenic Highlands Route and is surrounded by mountains. The Rooiberge is the range encompassing the village, whilst further towards the southeast are the Maluti mountains in shades of purple and blue. All around are the sandstone cliffs with their multi-coloured layers - these horizontal strata are a characteristic feature of the area. Many homes in the Clarens Valley are made from or clad in sandstone.

There are various establishments offering accommodation, including bed & breakfasts, self-catering, lodges, backpackers and farm guest houses in the surrounding area.

Activities include: horse riding, abseiling, hiking, fly fishing, fossil hunting, white water rafting and golf. Live music is often performed on weekends.

Dinosaur fossils in Clarens

Large Jurassic dinosaurs lived in the eastern part of Free State about 200-million-years ago, when the giant southern super-continent, Gondwana, was still intact.

Discovery of fossils

From 12 January 2009 the remains of the largest dinosaurs to ever be found on South African soil were discovered in Clarens, a small town in Free State (province). Dr Jonah Choineire, a senior researcher at the Evolutionary Studies Institute, said the remains of the large creature were found between the border of Lesotho and South Africa just outside of Clarens.

The remains were discovered at a construction site of the Ingula Pump and Storage Scheme, developed by Eskom Holdings (Pty) Ltd. Mr Gavin Anderson, the project archaeologist, together with Dr Gideon Groenewald, a geologist/palaeontologist, was requested to assist with the recording of fossil
finds at the construction site. 
The sites of the excavations were inspected on a continuous basis during the excavation on 12 January 2009. To date (2017) twenty five sites have been recorded, where fossilised bone were found. Remains of the vertebrates discovered were very broken and unfortunately disturbed by the excavations.

A very well preserved tusk of a plant-eating reptile, possibly a Dicynodon lacerticeps, was later recorded. The discovery of well preserved bone fossils in the main quarry indicated that the interbedded mudstones in the region may have provided valuable information on the fauna of the ancient environment in that region.

Eskom Holdings (Pty Ltd) provided a container for storage of fossils on site. Temporary curation of fossils was done for that storage. The Gorgonopsian
and other fossils recorded up to 31 January 2009 were transported to the National Museum in Bloemfontein on 11 March 2009. New finds were stored in the container and only fossils that needed urgent identification were transported to Bloemfontein.

Types of dinosaurs discovered
The Massospondylus
The team discovered the remains of the largest dinosaur to walk in the southern parts of Africa, namely a 190-million-year-old fossilised egg of a Massospondylus dinosaur. This dinosaur lived in the Late Triassic and Early Jurassic, a period from about 230-million years ago to about 185-million years ago. The Massospondylus wandered about in great herds, migrating back and forth between what would millions of years later become Southern Africa and Russia, when the southern super-continent, Gondwana, was still intact. The rocks that were laid down during this period are called the Stormberg Group of rocks, and it is in rocks of the Stormberg Group that the fossils of Massospondylus and other dinosaurs were found. Massospondylus dinosaurs hatched from eggs not much larger than a  hen’s egg, but grew into big creatures 5 to 6 metres long. They had large bodies, long necks and small heads, and long tails.

Antetonitrus
Another species found was a 210-million-year-old sauropod named Antetonitrus. It was found in the Ladybrand District of the Free State (province). The dinosaurs dominated on Earth for about 120-million years until the end of the Cretaceous Period, 65-million years ago.

Today
With the discovery of the fossils, the small town of Clarens started giving 2-3 hour dinosaur tours to view the fossils. The Clarens Dinosaur Tour begins with a comprehensive talk on Geology and Paleontology of the region. Viewers then have the opportunity to see a  variety of fossils – from teeth, claws and limb bones of the prehistoric giants, to the leaf impressions of ancient ferns – while learning about what the Earth was like during that period and how the different rock layers were formed. The talk is followed by a trip to an ancient trackway, where the fossilized footprints of dinosaurs can be seen and followed.

See also
Massospondylus
Antetonitrus

References

External links

 Clarens Tourism Forum official website What to do, where to stay, eat, drink in Clarens.
 Information and photos of Clarens, artists in Clarens.
 Local municipality website.
"Oldest known dinosaur embryos identified" University of the Witwatersrand.
Post  about Antetonitrus on the Dinosaur Mailing List, written by Adam Yates.

Populated places in the Dihlabeng Local Municipality
Populated places established in 1912
1912 establishments in South Africa